Bonsa Deriba Dida (born 21 January 1995) is an Ethiopian male long-distance runner who competes in track, road and cross country running. He has represented Ethiopia three times at the IAAF World Cross Country Championships and at the 2014 IAAF World Half Marathon Championships.

He made his debut over the marathon in May 2014, recording 2:12:33  at the Hamburg Marathon. He returned to the distance in January 2017 and came fifth at the Mumbai Marathon with a time of 2:11:55.

Personal bests
3000 metres – 8:04.64 min (2014)
5000 metres – 13:41.44 min (2011)
10,000 metres – 28:13.84 min (2016)
10K run – 27:53 min (2015)
Half Marathon – 60:19 min (2015)
Marathon – 2:11:55 (2017)

All information from All-Athletics

International competitions

References

External links

Living people
1995 births
Ethiopian male long-distance runners
Ethiopian male cross country runners
Ethiopian male marathon runners
21st-century Ethiopian people